Dream Dancing is a 1978 album by Ella Fitzgerald. Twelve of the tracks on this album were recorded in June 1972 and originally released on Fitzgerald's 1972 Atlantic album, Ella Loves Cole. In 1978, Pablo Records repackaged the album with the addition of two new recordings from February 1978.

Track listing
For the 1978 LP on Pablo Records; Pablo 2310 814; Re-issued by Pablo Records in 1987 on CD; PACD 2310 814-2

All songs written by Cole Porter.

Side one
 "Dream Dancing"   – 4:02
 "I've Got You Under My Skin" – 3:17
 "I Concentrate on You" – 4:06
 "My Heart Belongs to Daddy" – 2:33
 "Love for Sale" – 4:36
 "So Near and Yet So Far" – 2:21
 "Down in the Depths (on the Ninetieth Floor)" – 3:40

Side two
 "After You, Who?"   – 3:14
 "Just One of Those Things" – 3:53
 "I Get a Kick Out of You" – 4:21
 "All of You" – 2:18
 "Anything Goes" – 2:51
 "At Long Last Love" – 2:27
 "C'est Magnifique" – 2:32
 "Without Love" – 2:46

Personnel
 Ella Fitzgerald – vocals
 Nelson Riddle  – arranger, conductor
 Jackie Davis – electronic organ
 Louie Bellson – drums
 Paul Smith – piano (track 5)
 John Heard – double bass
 Bob Tricarico, Don Christlieb – bassoon
 Mahlon Clark, Bill Green – clarinet 
 Harry Klee, Wilbur Schwartz – flute
 Ralph Grasso – guitar
 Gordon Schoneberg, Norman Benno – oboe
 Bill Watrous, Christopher Riddle, Dick Noel (track 2), J. J. Johnson – trombone
 Al Aarons, Carroll Lewis, Charles Turner (track 3), Shorty Sherock – trumpet

References

1978 albums
Ella Fitzgerald albums
Pablo Records albums
Albums produced by Norman Granz
Albums arranged by Nelson Riddle
Cole Porter tribute albums